Leopoldo D'Angelo (born 11 July 1995 in Turin, Italy, better known by the pseudonym "Dangiuz", is an Italian contemporary visual artist, digital artist and art director specializing in sci-fi themes. His work has been featured in art networks, TV channels and magazines such as  RAI, Arte, Wallpaper*,  NVIDIA Studio Standouts, Juxtapoz Magazine, Sohu and Digital Production, and showcased in various museums and galleries worldwide. He also took part in the creation of Rui Hachimura's Cherry Blossom kimono design and Maserati's MC20 concept art.

Style and career
His work, artistic style and concepts fall under the Sci-Fi and Cyberpunk categories, and his figure is often linked to digital art, 3D design, Sci-Fi/Cyberpunk genres in cinema and NFTs, sometimes in controversial terms. His art is produced with  3D computer graphics software and depicts dystopian scenarios with references and hints to Blade Runner and Ghost in the Shell, whomst the artist stated to be inspired from. He mentions Vincent van Gogh as his all time favorite painter, while Syd Mead and Beeple are the contemporary artists that influence him the most.

NFTs

In February 2021, "Grand Challenge", one of D'Angelo's artworks, was one of the first digital artworks sold as a non-fungible token by an Italian digital artist. In March 2021, upon digital art and NFTs gaining popularity due to Beeple's Everydays: the First 5000 Days sale, D'Angelo rose to prominence together with other digital artists, establishing himself in the following months as one of the most prolific digital artists selling single edition artworks (1/1s) as NFTs on the curated invite only platform SuperRare, along with other popular digital artists such as  XCOPY, Pak and Skygolpe,. In June 2022 he took part to a charity auction at Christie's, with all the proceeds being donated to  MAPS. The NFT of his artwork "Enchanter" was auctioned and sold, realizing a price of $44,100.

Selected Art exhibitions and galleries 

  Maxon Cinema 4D official gallery, digital, 2019
 “Heart of Cyberpunk” exhibition in Hong Kong, 2020
 “Invisible Cities” exhibition, digital, 2021
 ”NFTNYC” exhibition in Times Square, New York City, 2021
 “Lugano NFT Week” exhibition at Villa Ciani in Lugano, 2021
 “DART2121” exhibition at Museo della Permanente in Milan, 2021
 “CryptoArtFair UAE” exhibition at Abu Dhabi National Exhibition Centre in Abu Dhabi, 2021
 “NFTBKK” exhibition in Bangkok, 2022
 “Milano Art Week 2022” exhibition in Milan, 2022
  Vanity Fair's "MetaVanity", digital, 2022
 SuperRare Gallery in  SoHo, New York City, 2022

References

External links 
 Official Website

1995 births
21st-century Italian male artists
Living people
Artists from Turin
Digital artists
Pseudonymous artists